The 2007 Peace Cup Korea was a football tournament held in South Korea between 12 July and 21 August 2007. It was the third edition of Peace Cup. Lyon defeated Bolton Wanderers 1–0 in the final on 21 July, to become the winner first time in its last three participation.

Venues

Matches 
All times are Korea Standard Time (UTC+9).

Group stage 
The teams placed first (shaded in green) will be qualified to the Final.

Group A

Group B

The Final

Goalscorers 
2 goals

  Matías Abelairas (River Plate)
  Kevin Nolan (Bolton Wanderers)
  Nicolas Anelka (Bolton Wanderers)
  Karim Benzema (Olympique Lyonnais)
  Jesús Padilla (Guadalajara)
  Sergio Santana (Guadalajara)
  Kim Källström (Olympique Lyonnais)

1 goal

  Marco Ruben (River Plate)
  Simon Cox (Reading)
  Anthony Mounier (Olympique Lyonnais)
  Hatem Ben Arfa (Olympique Lyonnais)
  Brynjar Gunnarsson (Reading)
  Nam Ki-Il (Seongnam Ilhwa Chunma)
  Julio Nava (Guadalajara)
  Jesús Morales (Guadalajara)
  Zoltán Harsányi (Bolton Wanderers)
  Gonzalo Colsa (Racing de Santander)

Broadcasting rights 
Following broadcasting systems has the rights for the broadcast of 2007 Peace Cup.

 Spain:
 La Sexta (all matches)
 TV3 (opening match)

 South Korea:
 SBS (all matches)

 England:
 Setanta Sports (All matches)

References

External links 
 Official site 
 Peace Cup on Goalzz.com

2007
2007
2007 in South Korean football
2007 in Japanese football
2007–08 in English football
2007–08 in Spanish football
2007–08 in French football
2007–08 in Mexican football
2007–08 in Argentine football